The large moth family Crambidae contains many genera.

References 

 -
Crambid